Wind in the Wire is a 1993 American made-for-television film directed by Jim Shea. It tells the story of children learning to be cowboys and was made to launch Randy Travis's album of the same name.

Cast

References

External links
Wind in the Wire at IMDb
Wind in the Wire at TCMDB

1993 television films
1993 films
American television films